LOL is an initialism for 'laugh(ing) out loud' in Internet slang, and once 'lots of love' in letter writing.

LOL, LoL, or Lol may also refer to:

Film and television
 LOL (2006 film), a film by Joe Swanberg
 LOL (Laughing Out Loud), a 2008 French comedy movie starring Christa Theret and Sophie Marceau
 LOL (2012 film), an American remake of the 2008 French film starring Miley Cyrus and Demi Moore
 "LOL" (Californication), an episode of Californication
 LOL (format), a television international format
 LOL (web series) (2009)
 Lorraine "Lol" Jenkins, a character in This Is England
 Lunch Out Loud, a Philippine noontime variety show broadcast on TV5
 Lol:-), a Canadian dialogue-less comedy series

Business and organisations
 Laugh Out Loud Productions (LOL!), a comedy company founded by Kevin Hart
 Liberating Ourselves Locally, a hackerspace/makerspace in the Fruitvale District of Oakland, California
 L.O.L. Surprise!, a line of children's toys
 Loyal Orange Lodge, a Protestant fraternal organisation belonging to the Orange Institution

Gaming
 LOL (video game), a 2007 game for the Nintendo DS
 L.O.L.: Lack of Love, a 2000 game for the Sega Dreamcast
 LoL, or League of Legends, a 2009 multiplayer online video game
 Lands of Lore, a role playing video game series from 1993 to 1999 by Westwood Studios

Music
 Lol (Japanese group), a performance group
 Lords of Lyrics (L.O.L.), a Los Angeles-based hip-hop group formed in 1992

Albums
 LOL (Blog 27 album) (2005)
 LOL (Basshunter album) (2006)
 LOL (GFriend album) (2016)

Songs
 "LOL!" (Meisa Kuroki song) (2010)
 "LOL", a 2009 song by Sinai Rose that appeared in Kidz Bop 16

Places
 Lol, Dordogne, a populated place in Aquitaine, France
 Lol River, a stream in South Sudan
 Lol State, a state of South Sudan 
 Derby Field, American airport in Nevada (by IATA code)

Other uses
 .lol, an Internet top-level domain
 Mongo language (by ISO 639-3 language code)

People with the given name
 Lol Mahamat Choua (1939–2019), Chadian politician and president
 Lol Coxhill (1932–2012), English saxophonist
 Lol Crawley (born 1974), English cinematographer
 Lol Creme (born 1947), English musician, member of 10cc and Godley & Creme
 Lol Morgan (born 1931), former professional footballer and manager
 Lol Tolhurst (born 1959), former member of rock band The Cure
 Lol Solman (1863–1931), Canadian businessman

See also
 
 101 (disambiguation)
 IOI (disambiguation)
 IOL (disambiguation)
 LOL memory (Little Old Lady memory), or core rope memory, NASA software literally woven by female workers in factories
 LOLCODE, a high-level esoteric programming language
 Loll (disambiguation)
 Lolol, a Chilean commune and town in Colchagua Province, O'Higgins Region